J.W. Clark may refer to:

James West Clark (1779–1843), a United States Representative from North Carolina
James Waddey Clark (1877–1939), a Justice of the Oklahoma Supreme Court
John Willis Clark (1833–1910), English academic and antiquarian
John W. Clark (architect), American architect
Joseph Walter "Joe" Clark (1890–1960), an English professional footballer